Federal Route 120, or Jalan Makam Mahsuri, is a major federal road in Langkawi Island, Kedah, Malaysia. It is also a main route to Makam Mahsuri.

Features

At most sections, the Federal Route 120 was built under the JKR R5 road standard, allowing maximum speed limit of up to 90 km/h.

List of junctions and town

References

Malaysian Federal Roads
Roads in Langkawi